Alfa Romeo 110AF is Italian trolleybus produced from Alfa Romeo from 1939 to 1944.

History
Trolleybuses from this model were used in the big cities to 1973. The cities which this trolleybus transported people were Rome, Milan, Naples, Genoa, Salerno and in the south part Salerno. It is very comfort vehicle for that time and had long life in the transport system of Italy.

Movie
The trolleybus stars in La signora senza camelie an Italian movie from 1953.

Technical characteristics
It use motor Breda MTR 290/230 with 120HP. The length in the short version is 9 m and the other version is 12 m. It had 3 wheelbases. It had places for 89 people and 45 seats.

Production
Model 110 AF/5 from Macchi - Breda                  20 examples.
Model 110 AF/5 from Varesina - Breda                  10 examples.
Model 110 AF/8 from Macchi-CGE                  10 examples.

See also
 List of buses

110AF